Harold Vermont Dutton Jr. (born February 17, 1945) is a Democratic member of the Texas House of Representatives representing District 142. He was first elected in 1984 and is one of the longest-serving members of the Texas House of Representatives.

Legislation 

In 2015 an amendment written by Dutton to House Bill 1842 gave the Texas Education Agency the power to take over failign school districts. The Agency used that authority in 2023 to take over the Houston Independent School District, of whose failings Dutton has been a longtime critic.

In May 2021, Dutton supported a bill that would restrict the ability of transgender children to participate in sports aligning with their gender identity. Members of his party called it an act of retaliation, as an unrelated education bill supported by Dutton was killed on the House floor the night before he came out in support of the transgender bill.

Personal life 
Dutton is Catholic, a member of Our Mother of Mercy Catholic Church in Freetown.

References

External links
 

 Legislative page
 Harold Dutton Jr. at the Texas Tribune

1945 births
Living people
Politicians from Houston
Democratic Party members of the Texas House of Representatives
Texas Southern University alumni
Thurgood Marshall School of Law alumni
21st-century American politicians
African-American state legislators in Texas
Texas lawyers
African-American Catholics
21st-century African-American politicians
20th-century African-American people